Venalil Oru Mazha is a 1979 Indian Malayalam-language film, directed by Sreekumaran Thampi and produced by S. Kumar. The film stars Madhu, Jayan, Sukumari and Srividya in the lead roles. The film has musical score by M. S. Viswanathan. The film was a remake of the Tamil film Mullum Malarum.

Plot 
Vasu adores his younger sister Janu. It is at her insistence that he helps Kamalakshi and her mother find employment at the power station where he works as a trolley operator. Vasu can't stand the new engineer Raveendran but the engineer does not return his animosity. Matters grow worse when Vasu loses his hand in an accident when he got drunk after being suspended from duty by Raveendran for a few days. A remorseful Raveendran helps with his treatment and tries to gift money at Vasu's wedding with Kamalakshi. But Vasu's hatred only deepens. Not even the fact that his sister Janu is in love with Raveendran is enough to change Vasu's mind. He declines Raveendran's marriage proposal publicly and fixes her marriage elsewhere. His wife Kamalakshi decides that this vendetta is pointless and persuades Raveendran and Janu to elope. Vasu stops them on the way to the wedding and emotionally manipulates Janu into choosing her brother over her lover. However he changes his mind and decides that Janu's happiness is worth more than his hatred for Raveendran and gives his permission for the marriage.

Cast 
Madhu as Vasu
Jayan as Engineer Raveendran
Srividya as Kamalakshi
Sukumari as Teashop owner
Sreelatha Namboothiri as Sukumari's daughter
Poojappura Ravi
Roja Ramani as Janu

Soundtrack

References

External links 
 

1979 films
1970s Malayalam-language films
Malayalam remakes of Tamil films
Films scored by M. S. Viswanathan
Films based on adaptations
Films directed by Sreekumaran Thampi